Sitting Pretty or Sittin' Pretty may refer to:

Films, stage, and TV
Sitting Pretty (1924 musical), a Broadway musical produced by Guy Bolton and P.G Wodehouse, with music by Jerome Kern
Sitting Pretty (1933 film), featuring Jack Oakie, Jack Haley and Ginger Rogers
Sitting Pretty (1948 film), starring Robert Young, Maureen O'Hara and Clifton Webb
Sitting Pretty (TV series), a British show that ran for two seasons, starting in 1992
"Sitting Pretty", an episode of Family Matters

Books
Sitting Pretty, a 1976 novel by Al Young

Music
Sitting Pretty (Bobbie Gentry album) (1971), which consists of all but one song from Gentry's 1968 album Local Gentry
Sittin' Pretty (The Pastels album) (1989)
"Sitting Pretty", also called "The Money Song", a song from Cabaret (musical)
"Sittin' Pretty", a song on the album Local Gentry by Bobbie Gentry
"Sittin' Pretty", a song by Australian artist Shannon Noll